Gympie may refer to:

 Gympie, a city in Queensland, Australia 
 Gympie Airport
 Electoral district of Gympie
 Gympie Region, its local government authority
 Gympie Road, Brisbane, a road in Brisbane
 Gympie Arterial Road, a highway in Brisbane
 Gympie Gympie (Dendrocnide moroides), a stinging plant